New York is a former town in Wayne County, in the U.S. state of Iowa.

History
A post office called New York was established in 1856, and remained in operation until 1903. The community was named after the state of New York. Old maps show two churches and a school as well as other buildings, but none of these structures still stand.

References

Geography of Wayne County, Iowa
Ghost towns in Iowa
1856 establishments in Iowa